Yohan Demoncy (born 7 April 1996) is a French professional footballer who plays as a defensive midfielder for Annecy on loan from Ligue 2 club Paris FC.

Career

Paris Saint-Germain
Demoncy joined the youth academy of Paris Saint-Germain, and since 2014 played for their reserve side - eventually becoming captain of the reserves. On 25 June 2016, he signed his first professional contract with PSG for three years.

Orléans
On 30 January 2018, Demoncy joined US Orléans on loan from Paris Saint-Germain for the second half of the 2017–18 season. He made his professional debut with Orléans on 9 February 2018, scoring the late winner in extra time in a 3–2 Ligue 2 win over Chamois Niortais
On 22 June 2018, he joined Orléans permanently on a three-year deal.

Paris FC
In July 2021, Demoncy joined Paris FC on a three-year deal.

On 27 September 2022, Demoncy joined Annecy on loan for the 2022–23 season.

Career statistics

References

External links
 
 
 USOFoot Profile

Living people
1996 births
People from Gonesse
Footballers from Val-d'Oise
Association football midfielders
French footballers
Paris Saint-Germain F.C. players
US Orléans players
Paris FC players
FC Annecy players
Ligue 1 players
Ligue 2 players
Championnat National players
Championnat National 2 players
Championnat National 3 players